Kirk Jackson (born 16 October 1976) is a retired semi professional footballer who played as a striker.

Jackson mostly made his name as a non-League footballer although he has experience in League football. He was part of the Yeovil Town team which won the Conference in 2003.

Honours
Individual
Football Conference Goalscorer of the Month: March 2003

References

External links

1976 births
Living people
Footballers from Barnsley
English footballers
Association football forwards
Sheffield Wednesday F.C. players
Scunthorpe United F.C. players
Chesterfield F.C. players
Grantham Town F.C. players
Worksop Town F.C. players
Darlington F.C. players
Stevenage F.C. players
Yeovil Town F.C. players
Dagenham & Redbridge F.C. players
Hornchurch F.C. players
Weymouth F.C. players
Harrogate Town A.F.C. players
Tamworth F.C. players
Sheffield F.C. players
England semi-pro international footballers
English Football League players